is a Japanese all-female band.

History 
The band was formed in 2012 around Morning Musume member Reina Tanaka. Originally there were four members: Reina Tanaka (vocals), Marina Okada (vocals), Yuki Uozumi (guitar), Marin Miyazawa (guitar).

In July 2016 it was announced that Yuki Uozumi was to leave the band on September 16.

On February 27, 2019, it was announced that Marina Okada would graduate from the band at the end of March and that her contract with Upfront Create would also be terminated.

Following the graduation of Okada, in June 2019 it was announced that Lovendor would be going on hiatus and that Miyazawa's contract would be expiring in July.

Members 
  — vocals (leader)

Former members 
  — guitar (left on September 16, 2016)
 — vocals (left at the end of March 2019)
  — guitar (left at end of July 2019)

Discography

Mini-albums

Singles

Video Albums

References

External links 
 

Japanese rock music groups
All-female bands
Japanese pop music groups
Japanese-language singers
Japanese musical trios
Musical quartets
Musical groups established in 2012
2012 establishments in Japan
Up-Front Group
Musical groups from Tokyo